The GLAAD Media Award for Outstanding Drama Series is an annual award that honors drama series for excellence in the depiction of LGBT (lesbian, gay, bisexual, and transgender) characters and themes. It is one of several categories of the annual GLAAD Media Awards, which are presented by GLAAD—an American non-governmental media monitoring organization founded in 1985, formerly called the Gay & Lesbian Alliance Against Defamation—at ceremonies in New York City, Los Angeles, and San Francisco between March and June.

The award is one of the few to date back to the 1st GLAAD Media Awards in 1990, where the ABC series HeartBeat and NBC series L.A. Law won—one of only two instances in the award's history where there was a tie. It was not given in 1992, but has been awarded every year since 1993. That year also saw a tie, with Fox's Melrose Place and ABC's One Life to Live winning; the only instance when a soap opera won the award. For the 7th GLAAD Media Awards in 1996, the category was merged with Outstanding Comedy Series to create Outstanding Television Series, but this was reverted the following year.

For a drama series to be eligible, it must include at least one LGBT character in a leading, supporting, or recurring capacity. The award may be accepted by the show's producers, writers, and/or actors. Drama series selected by GLAAD are evaluated based on four criteria: "Fair, Accurate, and Inclusive Representations" of the LGBT community, "Boldness and Originality" of the project, significant "Impact" on mainstream culture, and "Overall Quality" of the project. GLAAD monitors mainstream media to identify which drama series will be nominated, while also issuing a Call for Entries that encourages media outlets to submit programs for consideration. Dramatic programs created by and for an LGBT audience must be submitted in order to be considered for nomination, as GLAAD does not monitor such works for defamation. Winners are determined by a plurality vote by GLAAD staff and board, Shareholders Circle members, as well as volunteers and affiliated individuals.

Since its inception, the award has been given to 24 drama series. With four consecutive wins out of five nominations, Brothers & Sisters has received the award more than any other program. Pose and Six Feet Under have won the award three times, while Chicago Hope, L.A. Law, and NYPD Blue have each won twice. With six nominations, Degrassi: The Next Generation is the series that has been nominated the most often without a win. The most recent recipient is FX's Pose, which was honored at the 33rd GLAAD Media Awards in 2022.

Winners and nominees

1990s

2000s

2010s

2020s

Multiple wins and nominations

Programs

The following programs received two or more Outstanding Drama Series awards:

The following programs received four or more Outstanding Drama Series nominations:

Networks

The following networks received two or more Outstanding Drama Series awards:

The following networks received four or more Outstanding Drama Series nominations:

Notes

References

External links
 GLAAD Media Awards

Drama Series